Short Drop Cave and Gavel Pot are different entrances into the same cave system on Leck Fell, in Lancashire, England. There are two other smaller entrances into Short Drop Cave. At its base the system links via a sump with Lost Johns' Cave, and is part of the Three Counties System, an  cave system which spans the borders of Cumbria, Lancashire, and North Yorkshire.

Description

The main entrance into Short Cave is at the end of a shallow valley where a small hole drops into a stream passage. Upstream leads to a canal passage which becomes too tight, although an excavated squeeze on the right before the end leads to the Coal Hole entrance. Downstream,  of mainly low passage leads to an oxbow with a larger passage arriving from Rift Entrance. A long awkward inlet passage called Masochist Passage can be followed to the north-east for some  almost up to the Rumbling Hole stream sinks, and an old high level route named Ancient Highway loops back to the main route.

Downstream continues as a canyon passage which steadily enlarges, passing an inlet passage on the left where the main water enters which can be followed up to where it becomes choked with boulders underneath the stream sink. A traverse can be followed over the top of the pitch round to where a pitch enters from the Gavel Pot doline.

Rift Entrance is a currently blocked entrance just over the wall from the main sink. A climb down enters a rift chamber, where a passage enters the First Oxbow in Short Drop Cave.

Coal Hole Entrance is located in a small shakehole SE of Rumbling Hole. A long crawl eventually reaches a bedding chamber with a coal seam exposed in the walls where an excavated squeeze drops into Canals Inlet in Short Drop Cave.

Scrambling down the eastern side, a ledge is reached where an  pitch lands at the end of the traverse from Short Drop Cave. In the other direction a high canyon passage soon enters the bottom of the Gavel Pot shakehole, overlooked by rocky ramparts. In the corner a further  pitch over a chockstone lands in a chamber where an excavated  drop lands in the main passage. The water from Short Drop soon enters from the right, and a large collapse from Ash Tree Hole on the surface is passed on the left. The final one lands in a chamber with a sump pool, which is a window into the underwater passages carrying water from Notts Pot to the resurgence at Leck Beck Head. Upstream here emerges at the downstream sump of Lost Johns' Cave after .

A window in the upper part of the main passage leads into a series of well decorated chambers called Glasfurd's Chamber.

The cave has been equipped with resin P-hangers allowing cavers to descend the cave using single rope techniques.

Geology and hydrology

The cave is a solutional cave formed in Visean Great Scar limestone from the Mississippian Series of the Carboniferous period. The various abandoned passages in Short Drop Cave show that it has a long history, but the current drainage flows through the main passages of Short Drop Cave and Gavel Pot to join the main Ireby Fell Cavern - Notts Pot water at the base of the cave, where it flows through to its resurgence at Leck Beck Head. The position and orientation of the main system is thought to have been influenced by a gentle syncline plunging towards the north-west, and the height of the development of Short Drop Cave has been influenced by a major inception horizon between the Lower Hawes and Goredale Limestones, identifiable by a thin bed of shale and sometimes coal.

History
The first recorded exploration of the Gavel Pot - Short Drop system was in 1885, when Messrs. They  referred to the cave as "Low Dowk Cave", seemingly under the impression it was Low Douk Cave near Marble Steps Pot. It was referred to as "Gavel-pot" in 1842 by Jonathan Otley, and in 1881 Balderstone referred to it as "Gavel or Navel Pot". Short Drop cave was explored through to Gavel Pot by a Yorkshire Ramblers' Club party in 1898. The Coal Hole entrance was explored to Short Drop in 1977 by the Cave Projects Group.

The main passages in Gavel Pot were first explored in 1970, when the Northern Pennine Club excavated a shaft in the final chamber. The upstream terminal sump was originally dived by Dave Yeandle. The downstream underwater connection with Lost Johns' Cave was made by Bob Churcher in 1975, and with Pippikin Pot in 1989 by Geoff Yeadon.

References

Caves of Lancashire
Caves of the Three Counties System
Wild caves
Karst caves